Kevin Lavallée (born December 12, 1981) is a Canadian-born German professional ice hockey defenceman playing for the Fischtown Pinguins in the Deutsche Eishockey Liga (DEL).

Career 
Lavallée previously played for Kölner Haie, EHC München, Hamburg Freezers and Iserlohn Roosters. He participated at the 2011 IIHF World Championship as a member of the Germany men's national ice hockey team.

References

External links
 
 

1981 births
Acadie–Bathurst Titan players
Augsburger Panther players
Charlotte Checkers (1993–2010) players
EHC München players
Florida Everblades players
German ice hockey players
Hamburg Freezers players
Iserlohn Roosters players
Kassel Huskies players
Kölner Haie players
Living people
Montreal Rocket players
Ice hockey people from Montreal
Straubing Tigers players
Canadian ice hockey defencemen
Canadian expatriate ice hockey players in Germany